Hasht-behesht (literally "eight heavens") may refer to:
Hasht Behesht, a pavilion in Isfahan, Iran
Hasht-behesht (architecture), a type of floor plan
Hasht-Bihisht (poem), a famous poem written by Amir Khusro